Vulpia fasciculata, the dune fescue, is a species of annual herb in the family Poaceae (true grasses). They have a self-supporting growth form and simple, broad leaves. Individuals can grow to 0.24 m.

Sources

References 

Pooideae
Flora of Malta